Maumusson is the name or part of the name of the following communes in France:

 Maumusson, Loire-Atlantique, in the Loire-Atlantique department
 Maumusson, Tarn-et-Garonne, in the Tarn-et-Garonne department
 Maumusson-Laguian, in the Gers department
 Baliracq-Maumusson, in the Pyrénées-Atlantiques department